Hypselonotus lineatus is a species of leaf-footed bug in the family Coreidae. It is found in Central America, North America, South America, and Mexico.

References

External links

 

Articles created by Qbugbot
Insects described in 1862
Coreini